Tamtrum was an Aggrotech duo from Aix-en-Provence (France), composed of artists Benoit XVI and Sylvicious. They released many singles on many different compilation albums such as Cyberlab Volume 5.0.  The friendship of Benoit and Sylvicious started in a French black metal band called Mandragor. When this band broke up, Sylvicious continued with his band Lucky Striker 201 until he met Benoit, who had already composed a couple of songs which would later be included on Some Atomik Songz. They sent demos out to several labels until the French label La Chambre Froide picked up the band.  The resulting release after Some Atomik Songz would Versus (2004) - a split CD featuring Lok-8.
 
The band has become well known because of their live shows. Sonic manipulations are accompanied by fire breathing and other uncanny acts you would rather expect to see at a carnival than a concert. By touring Europe extensively they made a name for themselves due to their harsh, grinding elektro which manages to mix the genre in its essence and the atmospheres of black metal.  In 2005 they released the mega hit Le Son de la Pluie (The Sound of the Rain) on the Alfa Matrix compilation Endzeit Bunkertracks: Act I. It became number one on the DAC.

They had a touring member besides the core who went by the name of Ins-ext. He added a lot to Tamtrum's show including fire breathing and live support, but after a few shows he left the band and was replaced by Fixxxer (also known as Fixhead).

In late 2005/early 2006 Tamtrum entered the studio to record the album Elektronic Black Mess and this for their new label Alfa Matrix. The line up for this album included the whole band and also holds guest vocals by the ex-Anorexia Nervosa singer Rose Hreidmarr. Some tracks had vocals by Fixxxer, who also contributed with the writing of the music which had been done by Benoit only. Elektronic Black Mess  was released in two different versions, a single disc edition and a 2CD limited edition set, the bonus disc containing remixes. The limited edition CD also comes with the Vatican-Approved Condom and two live appearance videos.

Musical groups from Provence-Alpes-Côte d'Azur